William Cuylle (born February 5, 2002) is a Canadian professional ice hockey left winger for the Hartford Wolf Pack of the American Hockey League (AHL) as a prospect to the New York Rangers of the National Hockey League (NHL). He was drafted 60th overall by the New York Rangers in the second round of the 2020 NHL Entry Draft.

Playing career

Early OHL career
Cuylle played junior hockey for the Windsor Spitfires in the Ontario Hockey League (OHL). He was the third overall pick in the 2018 OHL draft by the Peterborough Petes, selected behind only Quinton Byfield, who ended being the second overall selection in the 2020 NHL Entry Draft, and Evan Vierling, and just ahead of Jamie Drysdale, the sixth overall selection in the 2020 NHL Entry Draft. Cuylle did not think Peterborough was a good fit for him and he committed to play college hockey for Penn State University. When Peterborough traded his rights to Windsor in exchange for seven OHL draft picks, Cuylle decided to play for Windsor.

In his first season with Windsor, Cuylle scored 26 goals, fourth in the OHL among 16-year-old players, and 15 assists for 41 points. After the season, Cuylle was projected by many analysts to be a likely first round draft pick in the 2020 NHL Entry Draft. He started slowly in the 2019–20 season and had several eight game goal-scoring droughts. He finished the season with 22 goals and 20 assists, for 42 points, one more than the prior year. He ended up being ranked as the no. 34 draft-eligible North American skater by the NHL Central Scouting Bureau after being ranked no. 22 in mid-season. He was drafted by the New York Rangers in the second round of the 2020 NHL Entry Draft with the 60th overall pick in the draft. The Rangers received the pick by trading Lias Andersson, who was the seventh overall pick in the 2017 NHL Entry Draft, to the Los Angeles Kings.

2020-21
With the OHL shut down for the 2020–21 season due to the COVID-19 pandemic, Cuylle played in 18 games with the Rangers' American Hockey League (AHL) affiliate, the Hartford Wolf Pack, scoring two goals and three assists for a total of five points. On April 19, 2021, Cuylle signed an entry-level contract with the New York Rangers.

2021-22
Cuylle was ineligible to play for Hartford in the 2021–22 season because players under 20 years old needed to play at least 20 games in the AHL in 2020–21 to be permitted to remain in the AHL for 2021–22. This was the case even though Hartford had played only 24 games in 2020–21, so Cuylle had played 3/4 of their games. So Cuylle returned to Windsor. On October 14, 2021, the Windsor Spitfires announced that Cuylle would be the team captain for the 2021–22 OHL season, his third with the team. Cuylle had a much more productive season with Windsor in 2021–22 than his prior seasons, finishing the regular season with 43 goals and 37 assists in 59 games. As a result he was named the OHL's Second Team All-Star left wing.

Rangers' director of player development Jed Ortmeyer said of Cuylle's 2021–22 season "He went back [to the OHL] and showed some leadership skills, captain of the team, another long playoff run. A great experience for him. Wanted him to go back and start gaining that confidence of going to the net and scoring goals and he did that. So we're excited to see what he can do." Going into the 2022–23 season with a chance to win a position with the Rangers, Cuylle said "I think I just have to show a really good physicality and really good compete. I think my game is obviously being a power forward, being really good on the forecheck and just making things happen offensively. And just being really good defensively, too, as well bringing a really good, consistent 200-foot game."

2022-23
Cuylle began the 2022–23 season with the Hartford Wolf Pack. He was named to the 2023 AHL All-Star Classic during the 2022–23 season. He was called up to the Rangers on January 24 after scoring 13 goals and 7 assists in his first 39 games with Hartford. He made his NHL debut on January 25 in a game against the Toronto Maple Leafs in his hometown of Toronto. He returned to Hartford after a January 27 game against the Vegas Golden Knights.  The Rangers recalled him after the NHL All-Star Game hiatus, but returned him to Hartford after he played 2 more games when the Rangers acquired forward Vladimir Tarasenko.

International play

Cuylle was selected to Canada's team in the 2022 World Junior Ice Hockey Championships. He recorded two assists in two games before the tournament was shut down due to COVID-19 pandemic. Cuylle was also selected for the rescheduled World Junior Ice Hockey Championships in August 2022, which Canada won.

Playing style
Cuylle is a power forward who models his game after Washington Capitals forward and Rangers' nemesis Tom Wilson, and other power forwards such as Matthew Tkachuk and Jamie Benn. His style has also been compared to former Rangers' forward Brendan Lemieux and to Milan Lucic. According to former Windsor coach Trevor Letowski. Cuylle is "a high-energy, physical guy that can get up and down the ice really well for a big guy — and he can score." He also has a hard shot. According to Letowski, "He can find pockets in the offensive zone — those little, quiet areas — and if he gets it on a stick, especially in juniors, then he can just shoot it past goalies. It doesn't even have to be a perfect shot. It's just heavy, and it's quick."

NHL director of Central Scouting Dan Marr said of Cuylle ahead of the 2020 draft "He brings more of that power-forward type of game and I thought he got away from that last year...He can own the corner, battle for position at the net and play to the strengths of his size and [use] it in a smart way. He's got all the tools."

Career statistics

Regular season and playoffs

International

References

External links
 

2002 births
Living people
Canadian ice hockey left wingers
Ice hockey people from Ontario
Hartford Wolf Pack players
New York Rangers draft picks
New York Rangers players
Windsor Spitfires players